Ángelo Gonzalo Astorga Andrade (born 19 June 1993) is a Chilean footballer who last played in 2018 for General Velásquez as a goalkeeper.

References
 
 Ángelo Astorga at playmakerstats.com (English version of ceroacero.es)
 

1993 births
Living people
Chilean footballers
Santiago Morning footballers
Primera B de Chile players
Association football goalkeepers
Place of birth missing (living people)